This is the list of the best albums voted by the NME critics at the end of 1974. This was the first year the list was published. A ranked singles list was not compiled this year.

List of best albums

See also
NME Album of the Year
NME Single of the Year

References
NME 1974 End of year critic lists

British music-related lists
New Musical Express
1974 in British music
Lists of albums